The Syracuse University fraternity and sorority system offers organizations under the Panhellenic Council, the Interfraternity Council (IFC), the National Association of Latino Fraternal Organizations, the National Multicultural Greek Council, and the National Pan-Hellenic Council.

History 
Greek life at Syracuse began in 1871 with the installation of the men's fraternity Delta Kappa Epsilon. The first sorority was the alpha chapter of Alpha Phi, which was launched on September 18, 1872.

IFC social fraternities

Acacia (1911/2006)
Alpha Chi Rho (1905/2017)
Alpha Epsilon Pi (1947/2002)
Alpha Tau Omega (1950)
Delta Chi (1899/1967/2001)
Delta Kappa Epsilon (1871)
Delta Tau Delta (1910)
Delta Upsilon  (1891/2016)
Lambda Chi Alpha (1918/2014)
Phi Delta Theta (1887/2011)
Phi Gamma Delta(1901)
Phi Kappa Psi (1884)
Phi Kappa Theta (1925/2001)
Pi Kappa Alpha (1913)
Psi Upsilon (1875)
Sigma Alpha Mu (1913)
Sigma Chi (1904)
Sigma Phi Epsilon (1905)
Theta Chi (1928)
Zeta Beta Tau (1911)

Panhellenic social sororities

Alpha Chi Omega
Alpha Epsilon Phi 
Alpha Gamma Delta (Alpha chapter)
Alpha Phi (Alpha chapter)
Alpha Xi Delta
Delta Delta Delta
Delta Gamma
Delta Phi Epsilon
Gamma Phi Beta (Alpha chapter)
Kappa Alpha Theta
Kappa Kappa Gamma
Phi Sigma Sigma
Sigma Delta Tau

Professional Fraternity Council
Alpha Kappa Psi
Alpha Phi Omega
Alpha Chi Sigma
Alpha Omega Epsilon
Kappa Kappa Psi
Phi Sigma Pi
Delta Sigma Pi
Tau Beta Sigma
Theta Tau (1925 - permanently expelled in 2018)
Delta Kappa Alpha
Phi Alpha Delta

National Pan-Hellenic Council fraternities and sororities
Alpha Phi Alpha
Alpha Kappa Alpha
Kappa Alpha Psi
Omega Psi Phi
Delta Sigma Theta
Phi Beta Sigma
Sigma Gamma Rho
Zeta Phi Beta
Iota Phi Theta

The Latino Greek Council fraternities and sororities
Sigma Iota Alpha
Omega Phi Beta
Sigma Lambda Upsilon
Lambda Pi Chi
Phi Iota Alpha
Lambda Upsilon Lambda
Lambda Sigma Upsilon
Lambda Theta Alpha
Lambda Alpha Upsilon

The Multicultural Greek Council fraternities and sororities
Kappa Phi Lambda (1997)
Nu Alpha Phi (2007-2015; currently on suspension)
Sigma Beta Rho (2011)
Lambda Phi Epsilon (2015)
Sigma Psi Zeta (2018)
alpha Kappa Delta Phi (2019)

Music fraternities
Phi Mu Alpha Sinfonia
Sigma Alpha Iota
Kappa Kappa Psi
Tau Beta Sigma

References

 Syracuse University Office of Fraternity and Sorority Affairs (FASA)

Fraternity and sorority system
Lists of chapters of United States student societies by college
Fraternities